Bathycoccus prasinos is a picoplankton belonging to the order Mamiellales, along with Ostreococcus and Micromonas. The cells are around 1-2 μm in length, are non-motile and are covered in scales.

Genome
The small genome (15 Mb) was recently sequenced  and many of the genes are related to plants, though there is significant horizontal gene transfer from other eukaryotes. There are 19 chromosomes, two of which have a significantly different GC-content.

References

External links
 AlgaeBase

Mamiellophyceae